Platysquilla is a genus of mantis shrimp erected in 1967 by Raymond Manning for species previously included in Lysiosquilla.

References

Stomatopoda
Taxa named by Raymond B. Manning